A superhero is a fictional archetype.

Superhero or superheroes may also refer to:

Music
 Superheroes (band), a Danish pop rock band
 Superhero (musical), by Tom Kitt and John Logan

Albums
 Superhero (Brian McKnight album), 2001
 Superhero (Stephen Lynch album), 2003
 Superhero (Shoshana Bean album), 2008
 Superhero (Jed Madela album), 2019
 Superheroes (EP), a 2005 EP by Edguy
 Superheroes (Racer X album), 2000
 Superheroes (Dani Harmer album), 2009

Songs
 "Super Hero" (Shiritsu Ebisu Chugaku song)
 "Super Hero" (VIXX song)
 "Superhero" (Gary Barlow song)
 "Superhero" (Daze song)
 "Superhero" (Viki Gabor song)
 "Superheroes" (song), by the Script
 "Superhero" (Metro Boomin, Future and Chris Brown song)
 "Superhero", by Anthrax from We've Come for You All
 "Superhero", by Cher Lloyd from Sticks + Stones
 "Superhero", by Garrison Starr
 "Superhero", by Jane's Addiction, the theme song to the TV series Entourage
 "Superhero", by Simon Curtis from RA
 "Superhero", by Sophia & A-Lo, the official song of the 2013 CONCACAF Gold Cup
 "Superhero", by Flobots from Survival Story
 "Superheroes", by Daft Punk from Discovery
 "Superheroes", by The Firm
 "Super Hero", by Lower Than Atlantis from Lower Than Atlantis
 "Super Hero", by Stereo Fuse from Stereo Fuse
 “Super Hero”, a 2020 music video by Atreyu

Other uses
 Real-life superhero
 Superhero Movie, 2008 comedy film
 Superheroes (film), 2021 Italian film
 Superheroes: A Never-Ending Battle, 2013 documentary television series
 Dragon Ball Super: Super Hero, 2022 Japanese animated film
 Marvel Super Heroes (disambiguation), various Marvel Comics series and a television show
 The World's Greatest Superheroes, DC Comics newspaper comic strip
 Superhero fiction, subgenre of science fiction
 "Super Hero", episode of the Adult Swim animated television series, Aqua Teen Hunger Force
 Super Hero Time, programming block on TV Asahi

See also
 Superhuman, an entity with intelligence or abilities exceeding normal human standards
 Superman (disambiguation)